Alocasia clypeolata,  commonly known as green shield alocasia, is a species of Alocasia found in the Philippines.

References

External links
 
 

clypeolata
Endemic flora of the Philippines